Shah Mowmen (also Romanized as Shāh Mowmen; also known as Shāhmomen) is a village in Efzar Rural District, Efzar District, Qir and Karzin County, Fars Province, Iran. At the 2006 census, its population was 41, in 9 families.

References 

Populated places in Qir and Karzin County